Shemursha (Şămărşă) is a rural locality (a selo) and the administrative center of Shemurshinsky District of the Chuvash Republic, Russia. Population:

References

Notes

Sources

Rural localities in Chuvashia
Buinsky Uyezd